

Films

References

2006 in LGBT history
2006
2006-related lists